Richard Colestock Pillard (born 11 October 1933) is a professor of psychiatry at the Boston University School of Medicine. He was the first openly gay psychiatrist in the United States.

Early life and family

Pillard was born in Springfield, Ohio. He briefly attended Swarthmore College before transferring to Antioch College, where his father Basil H. Pillard was an English Professor. Pillard received his B.A. from  Antioch. He then earned his M.D. from University of Rochester, with his internship at Boston City Hospital.

Pillard married Vassar graduate Cornelia Livingston Cromwell in 1958, while he was in medical school. They later divorced when he was in his thirties, and Pillard now identifies as gay. He has three daughters. The oldest daughter, Victoria (Vicky) Pillard, is a pediatrician practicing in Holyoke, Massachusetts. His second daughter, Cornelia T. L. (Nina) Pillard, is a circuit judge for the United States Court of Appeals for the District of Columbia Circuit, and formerly a Georgetown University Law Center professor and assistant to Attorney General Janet Reno. His youngest daughter, Elizabeth Jane (Eliza) Pillard, is a social worker specializing in child psychiatric issues in Vermont.

Chandler Burr reported that Pillard jokes "he is uniquely equipped to investigate whether homosexuality has a biological basis: he, his brother, and his sister are gay, and Pillard believes that his father may have been gay. One of Pillard's three daughters from a marriage early in life is bisexual. This family history seems to invite a biological explanation, and it made Pillard start thinking about the origins of sexual orientation."

Heritability of sexual orientation
He and biologist James D. Weinrich co-authored a paper which found that homosexuality runs in some families. Pillard feels this is some of his most significant work, and that paper won the Society for the Scientific Study of Sexuality Hugo Beigel Award for the best paper published in the Journal of Sex Research.

Pillard is also well known for a series of studies he coauthored with the psychologist J. Michael Bailey, which examined the rate of concordance of sexual identity among monozygotic twins, dizygotic twins of the same sex, non-twin siblings of the same sex, and adoptive siblings of the same sex. In all studies they found rates of concordance variantly consistent with the hypothesis that homosexuality has a significant genetic component. The Council for Responsible Genetics and other researchers have criticized this work for using a self-selected sample, a problem which later studies have attempted to remedy.

Publications 
Lane HL, Pillard RC, Hedberg U (2011). The People of the Eye: Deaf Ethnicity and Ancestry. Oxford University Press US, 
Dawood K, Pillard RC, Horvath C, Revelle W, Bailey JM (2000). Familial aspects of male homosexuality. Arch Sex Behav. 2000 Apr;29(2):155-63. 
Bailey JM, Pillard RC, Dawood K, Miller MB, Farrer LA, Trivedi S, Murphy RL (1999). A family history study of male sexual orientation using three independent samples. Behav Genet. 1999 Mar;29(2):79-86.  
Pillard RC, Bailey JM (1998). Human sexual orientation has a heritable component. Hum Biol. 1998 Apr;70(2):347-65. 
Pillard RC, Bailey JM (1995). A biologic perspective on sexual orientation. Psychiatr Clin North Am. 1995 Mar;18(1):71-84. 
Snyder PJ, Weinrich JD, Pillard RC (1994). Personality and lipid level differences associated with homosexual and bisexual identity in men. Arch Sex Behav. 1994 Aug;23(4):433-51. 
Pillard RC, Rosen LR, Meyer-Bahlburg H, Weinrich JD, Feldman JF, Gruen R, Ehrhardt AA (1993). Psychopathology and social functioning in men prenatally exposed to diethylstilbestrol (DES). Psychosom Med. 1993 Nov-Dec;55(6):485-91. 
Bailey JM, Pillard RC, Neale MC, Agyei Y (1993). Heritable factors influence sexual orientation in women. Arch Gen Psychiatry. 1993 Mar;50(3):217-23. 
Weinrich JD, Snyder PJ, Pillard RC, Grant I, Jacobson DL, Robinson SR, McCutchan JA (1993). A factor analysis of the Klein sexual orientation grid in two disparate samples. Arch Sex Behav. 1993 Apr;22(2):157-68. 
Bailey JM, Pillard RC (1991). A genetic study of male sexual orientation. Arch Gen Psychiatry. 1991 Dec;48(12):1089-96. 
Tuttle GE, Pillard RC (1991). Sexual orientation and cognitive abilities. Arch Sex Behav. 1991 Jun;20(3):307-18. 
Pillard RC, Weinrich JD (1986). Evidence of familial nature of male homosexuality. Arch Gen Psychiatry. 1986 Aug;43(8):808-12. 
Pillard RC, Poumadere J, Carretta RA (1982). A family study of sexual orientation. Arch Sex Behav. 1982 Dec;11(6):511-20. 
Pillard RC, Poumadere J, Carretta RA (1981). Is homosexuality familial? A review, some data, and a suggestion. Arch Sex Behav. 1981 Oct;10(5):465-75. 
Lane HL, Pillard RC (1978). The Wild Boy of Burundi: a study of an outcast child. Random House, 
Pillard RC, Fisher S (1975). Chlordiazepoxide and phenobarbital in a model anxiety-inducing situation. Compr Psychiatry. 1975 Jan-Feb;16(1):97-101. 
Pillard RC, McNair DM, Fisher S (1974). Does marijuana enhance experimentally induced anxiety? Psychopharmacologia. 1974;40(3):205-10. 
Pillard RC, Rose RM, Sherwood M (1974). Plasma testosterone levels in homosexual men. Arch Sex Behav. 1974 Sep;3(5):453-8. 
Pillard RC (1973). Shall we allow heroin maintenance? N Engl J Med. 1973 Mar 29;288(13):682-3. 
Pillard RC (1971). Authors and editors: mutual responsibility. Am J Psychiatry. 1971 Apr;127(10):1420-1. 
Meyer RE, Pillard RC, Shapiro LM, Mirin SM (1971). Administration of marijuana to heavy and casual marijuana users. Am J Psychiatry. 1971 Aug;128(2):198-204. 
Mirin SM, Shapiro LM, Meyer RE, Pillard RC, Fisher S (1971). Casual versus heavy use of marijuana: a redefinition of the marijuana problem. Am J Psychiatry. 1971 Mar;127(9):1134-40. 
Pillard RC (1970). Marihuana. N Engl J Med. 1970 Aug 6;283(6):294-303. Review. 
Pillard RC, Fisher S (1970). Aspects of anxiety in dental clinic patients. J Am Dent Assoc. 1970 Jun;80(6):1331-4. 
Pillard RC, Fisher S (1967).Effects of chlordiazepoxide and secobarbital on film-induced anxiety. Psychopharmacologia. 1967;12(1):18-23. 
McNair DM, Droppleman LF, Pillard RC (1967). Differential sensitivity of two palmar sweat measures. Psychophysiology. 1967 Jan;3(3):280-4. 
Globus GG, Pillard RC (1966). Tausk's Influencing Machine and Kafka's In the Penal Colony. Am Imago. 1966 Fall;23(3):191-207.

References

1933 births
American psychiatrists
American sexologists
Antioch College alumni
Boston University faculty
Living people
Swarthmore College alumni
Psychiatry writers on LGBT topics
University of Rochester alumni